"Words of Love" is a 1957 song written by Buddy Holly.

Words of Love may also refer to:
 "Words of Love" (Mamas & the Papas song), 1966
 Words of Love (Tete Montoliu album), 1978
 Words of Love (Buddy Holly & The Crickets album), 1993 
 "Dragostea Din Tei", English title "Words of Love", a single by O-Zone